Nee Varuvai Ena is a 1999 Indian Tamil-language romantic drama film written and directed by Rajakumaran. The film stars Parthiban, Ajith Kumar and Devayani. Ramesh Khanna, Vijayakumar, Fathima Babu, Jai Ganesh, and Sathyapriya also play important roles. The film released on 15 August 1999. It was later remade in Telugu as Ninne Premistha (2000), in Kannada Ninne Preethisuve (2002) and in Malayalam as Pranayamanithooval (2002).

Plot
Ganesh, is the only son of Mudaliar-Gounder inter-caste parents. He loses several prospective brides due to this and spends his time dreaming of marriage. On a bus ride to Chengalpattu to take up a promotion as a bank manager, he gets involved in an accident. The scene shifts to three months later when he finally shows up at Chengalpattu. Nandini, who lives in the house opposite to his, showers affection on him, gives him coffee, provides him with hot water, etc. Ganesh falls in love with Nandini, but when he visits her family with his parents to talk about marriage, she rejects him.

Nandini reveals the real reason behind her attachment to Ganesh. She tells him about her ill-fated love affair with army officer Subramani. Subramani and Nandini's wedding was planned, and on the day before the wedding, Subramani meets with an accident and passes away. Coincidentally, this was the same bus accident in which Ganesh was also travelling. Ganesh lost his vision in the accident, and Subramani's eyes have been donated to Ganesh, which made her fall in love with his eyes. Eager to send him on his way, Nandini sends a letter in Ganesh's name to Ganesh's home, accepting the latest girl whom they picked for him. Ganesh returns home to find arrangements for his wedding in full swing. Coincidentally, the girl turns out to be Subalakshmi, someone he had dreamed of marrying during his pre-Nandini days. However, Ganesh cancels the wedding plans and returns to Chengalpet. In the end, it is shown that Ganesh and Nandini remain good friends without getting married.

Cast

 Parthiban as Ganesh
 Ajith Kumar as Subramani (guest)
 Devayani as Nandini
 Vijayakumar as Subramani's father
 Fathima Babu as Subramani's mother
 Jai Ganesh as Ganesh's father
 Sathyapriya as Ganesh's mother
 Crane Manohar as Maarisamy
 Ramesh Khanna as Ganesh's friend
 Vadivukkarasi as Nandini's mother
 Vaiyapuri
 Madhan Bob as Banker
 Shanmugasundaram as Nandini's father
 Singamuthu
 T. S. Raghavendra
 Gowthami Vembunathan
 Master Mahendran
 Saranya Nag (child artiste)
 Suvalakshmi as Subalakshmi (guest appearance)
 Kanal Kannan as bus passenger (guest appearance)

Production
The film marked the directorial debut of Rajakumaran, who had earlier assisted director Vikraman. Initially Vijay was offered the role of Parthiban, he liked the story but wished to act in the role offered to Ajith but as Ajith refused to change the role, Vijay left the film and the role went to Parthiban.

Soundtrack
The film's soundtrack and background score was composed by S. A. Rajkumar.

Release and reception 
The film was released on 15 August 1999. The film was described as "a film definitely worth watching" by a critic from Indolink.com and cites that "it is bound to touch your heart and make you wonder about the power of love", The New Indian Express wrote "The plot is almost always predictable, and at times, even degenerates into blatant stupidity. But the director presents all this with such a straight face, that you find yourself lapping it all up". Kalki wrote that though the director managed the first half, he successfully made them fail in examination by testing their patience in the second half. The film went on to win the Tamil Nadu State Film Award for Best Storywriter for Rajakumaran.

The success of the film led to a Telugu remake as Ninne Premistha. It was also remade in Kannada as Ninne Preethisuve.

References

External links
 

1999 films
Tamil films remade in other languages
Films set in Chennai
1990s Tamil-language films
Indian romantic drama films
Films scored by S. A. Rajkumar
1999 directorial debut films
1999 romantic drama films
Super Good Films films